FK Slovan Nemšová is a Slovak football team, based in the town of Nemšová. The club was founded in 1928.

Affiliated clubs

The following club is currently affiliated with FK Slovan Nemšová:

  AS Trenčín (2012–present)

References

External links 
 
 at sportarealnts.sk 

 
Slovan Nemsova
Association football clubs established in 1928
1928 establishments in Slovakia
Sport in Trenčín Region